Mariano Lozano (18 April 1894 – 11 December 1968) was a Mexican tennis player. He competed in the men's singles and doubles events at the 1924 Summer Olympics.

References

External links
 

1894 births
1968 deaths
Mexican male tennis players
Olympic tennis players of Mexico
Tennis players at the 1924 Summer Olympics
Tennis players from Mexico City
Central American and Caribbean Games gold medalists for Mexico
Central American and Caribbean Games silver medalists for Mexico
Central American and Caribbean Games medalists in tennis
20th-century Mexican people